Sumberejo Station is a railway station located in Sumberejo, Bojonegoro Regency, East Java. The elevation of this station is +16 metres.

Services
The following is a list of train services at the Sumberejo Station

Passenger services
 Local economy

References

Bojonegoro Regency
Railway stations in East Java